Gvardeysky District is an administrative district (raion), one of the fifteen in Kaliningrad Oblast, Russia. It is located in the center of the oblast. Its administrative center is the town of Gvardeysk. Population:  32,101 (2002 Census);  The population of Gvardeysk accounts for 46.4% of the district's total population.

Geography
The district is situated in the center of the oblast, east of Kaliningrad, the administrative center of the oblast.

Main rivers in the district include the Pregolya and its branch the Deyma.

Administrative and municipal status
Within the framework of administrative divisions, Gvardeysky District is one of the fifteen in the oblast. The town of Gvardeysk serves as its administrative center.

As a municipal division, the district has been incorporated as Gvardeysky Urban Okrug since June 11, 2014. Prior to that date, the district was incorporated as Gvardeysky Municipal District, which was subdivided into one urban settlement and four rural settlements.

Demographics
The district is among the more densely populated districts of the oblast.

Economy
District economy is agrarian. The main railway line and road from Kaliningrad to Moscow pass through the district, parallel with the Pregolya.

References

Notes

Sources

Districts of Kaliningrad Oblast